Japanese Submarine I-178 (I-78, until 20 May 1942) was a Kaidai type of cruiser submarine that saw service during World War II in the Imperial Japanese Navy. Commissioned on December 26, 1942, I-178 was a KD7 sub-class boat that sailed on just two patrols off the east coast of Australia during 1943, going missing sometime after 17 June 1943.

Design and construction
The diesel-electric propulsion system provided a maximum speed of  when surfaced or  when submerged. The boats could operate for 75 days before resupply. Armament consisted of six forward-facing torpedo tubes firing Long Lance torpedoes (with 14 carried), a 4.7-inch deck gun, and a 25-millimetre anti-aircraft gun.

The submarine was built at the Mitsubishi Yard. She was completed in 1942.

Operational history
Assigned to Submarine Squadron Three of the Sixth Fleet, I-178 sailed from Japan on 30 March 1943, and reached Truk on 7 April. Three days later, the submarine left to commence a patrol off the eastern coast of Australia, supporting sister boat I-177. At 18:45 on 27 April 1943, the submarine torpedoed the Liberty ship Lydia M. Child 90 miles off the coast of Newcastle, New South Wales. There were allegedly no casualties among the freighter's 62 crew, who were all rescued the next day. I-178 escaped despite multiple attempted bombing runs by a Catalina from No. 11 Squadron RAAF.

She returned to Truk on 18 May, but was ordered to sail again two days later, returning to the Australian coast. The patrol was initially uneventful, but after sending a routine radio signal on 17 June, I-178 was never heard from again.

Fate
On 4 August 1943, the submarine was declared lost with all hands. She was struck from the Navy List on 1 September.

Claims for sinking the submarine vary, with different sources identifying the responsible party as the U.S. Navy submarine chasers SC-669 or SC-699 off Espirito Santo on 29 May 1943 (this claim is discounted, as I-178 was still in radio contact until 17 June), three Bristol Beauforts of No. 32 Squadron RAAF off Coffs Harbour, New South Wales on 17 June (Claim is reasonably strong), or the destroyer  near the Solomon Islands on 25 August 1943.

Citations

References

Type KD7 submarines
Kaidai-class submarines
World War II submarines of Japan
Ships built by Mitsubishi Heavy Industries
Maritime incidents in June 1943
Japanese submarines lost during World War II
Missing submarines of World War II